Julien Davies Cornell (March 17, 1910 – December 2, 1994) was an American lawyer. Cornell, a graduate of Swarthmore College and the Yale Law School and a descendant of Ezra Cornell, was a pacifist who defended many conscientious objectors who refused to serve in World War II and wrote two books on the subject of conscientious objection, The Conscientious Objector and the Law (1943) and Conscience and the State (1944). Cornell's greatest notoriety came from his defense of Ezra Pound following Pound's indictment for treason for his wartime broadcasts denouncing the Allied war effort and its political leaders and praising Benito Mussolini and Adolf Hitler, an experience Cornell chronicled in The Trial of Ezra Pound (1966).

External links
 Julien D. Cornell Papers, Collection Identifier: SCPC-DG-010 from Swarthmore College Peace Collection, Swarthmore College

References

1910 births
1994 deaths
Lawyers from Brooklyn
Writers from Brooklyn
Swarthmore College alumni
Yale Law School alumni
American pacifists
Cornell family
Ezra Pound
20th-century American poets
20th-century American lawyers